Hoyle is an English surname. Notable people with the surname include:

 Arthur Hoyle (1922–2012), Australian historian and biographer
 Bert Hoyle (1920–2003), English footballer
 Colin Hoyle (born 1972), English footballer
 David Hoyle (performance artist) (born 1962), British performance artist
 David W. Hoyle (born 1939), North Carolina politician
 Dean Hoyle (born 1967), British businessman
 Doug Hoyle (born 1930), British politician
 Edmond Hoyle (1672–1769), compiler of rules of card games
 Sir Fred Hoyle (1915–2001), British astronomer and science fiction writer
 Geoff Hoyle (born 1945), British actor
 Geoffrey Hoyle (born 1942), English science fiction writer, son of Sir Fred Hoyle
 Henry Hoyle (born 1852), Australian politician and rugby league football administrator
 Isaac Hoyle (1828–1911), British mill owner and politician
Jacob Hoyle (born 1994), American Olympic fencer
 Jonas Hoyl (1834–1906), American politician
 Joshua Hoyle (died 1654), English theologian
 Katie Hoyle (born 1988), New Zealand footballer
 Sir Lindsay Hoyle (born 1957), British politician and current Speaker of the House of Commons
 Mark Hoyle (born 1987), British YouTuber known as LadBaby
 Rebecca Hoyle, British mathematician
 Robert Hoyle (1781–1857), British businessman and politician
 Stephen Hoyle (born 1992), English footballer
 Theodore Hoyle (1884–1953), English cricketer
 Trevor Hoyle (born 1940), English science fiction writer
 William Hoyle (disambiguation)

See also
Hoyle Casino, a computer casino simulation game, named for Edmond Hoyle
Hoyle Card Games, a computer game, also named for Edmond Hoyle
 United States Playing Card Company, owners of the "Hoyle" brand for playing cards

References